C9 Entertainment is a South Korean entertainment agency founded in 2012 by Kim Dae-soon. The company operates as a record label, talent agency, music production company and event management.

The company was a subsidiary of Claire's Korea, parent company of Cloud9, Guerisson, and Lensnine (until 2018).

The company is home to artists including Younha, Doko, CIX, Cignature (under the sub-label J9 Entertainment), and Epex.

History
In 2012, C9 was previously founded as a one-man agency of singer Younha named Wealive and later the one-man agency signed a partnership with hip-hop label Alive. In July 2015, Wealive-Alive merged with indie label Realive and then officially launched their company, C9 Entertainment.

In 2016, C9 Entertainment merged with GG Entertainment which manages Eugene, Lee See Eun, and Jung Ui Chul. They also signed partnership with Benq Korea on their gaming brand, Zowie. In the same year, soloist Juniel signed C9 Entertainment.

In March 2017, C9 moved their office from Gangnam to a new building in Mapo.

In August 2017, C9 Entertainment debuted their first girl group Good Day. All the members (except Chaesol) was previously introduced to media during 2016 C9's trainees showcase.

On November 2, 2018, CI Entertainment's CEO had acquired 100 percent stake in C9. But, they still operate separately  and CI Ent moved their office as same building as C9 Entertainment.

In January 2019, SG Wannabe member Lee Seok-hoon signed with C9.

On July 23, 2019, C9 debuted their five-member boy group CIX.

In November 2019, C9 began promoting their upcoming girl group C9 Girlz and announced its first member, Jeewon (formerly Jiwon), originally part of Good Day.  Former Good Day members Chaesol, Sunn (formerly Viva), Belle (formerly Lucky), YeAh (formerly Haeun) and trainee Seline, Semi were also introduced as members of the group. On January 14, 2020, the 7-member C9 Girlz's official group name was revealed to be Cignature and will be managed by C9 Entertainment's new music label, J9 Entertainment. On February 4, 2020, Cignature made their debut with the single "Nun Nu Nan Na".

In March 2021, C9 began introducing the members for their upcoming eight-member boy group C9 Rookies, later renamed as Epex.  On June 8, 2021, Epex made their debut with the EP Bipolar Pt.1: Prelude of Anxiety.

Artists

Recording artists
Soloists
 Younha
 Lee Seok-hoon 
 Bae Jin-young
 Doko

Groups
 CIX
 Cignature
 Epex

Duos
 Poetic Narrator

Former artists
Recording artists
 Jung Joon-young (2016–2018)
 Olltii
 Drug Restaurant (2016–2018)
 Pia
 GroovyRoom
 JJK
 Lugoh
 ByeBye Badman
 Cho Duckhwan
 Good Day (2017–2019)
 Jacoby Planet
 Cheetah (2014–2020)
 Cignature
 Ye Ah (2020–2021)
 Sunn (2020–2021)
 Juniel (2016–2021)

Actors/actresses
 Eugene (2016–2018)
 Han Eunseo (2016–2018)
 Kim Chae-yoon
 Son Narae
 Yi So-jung
 Lee See-eun
 Choi Byung-mo
 Kang Nam-gyu
 Jung Gyu-woon (2017–2020)

Notes

References

External links
 

South Korean record labels
Talent agencies of South Korea
Record labels established in 2012
Labels distributed by CJ E&M Music and Live
Labels distributed by Kakao M